Tolarville is an unincorporated community located in Holmes County, Mississippi, located approximately  east of Thornton and approximately  north of Coxburg. A post office operated under the name Tolarville from 1888 to 1914.

References

Unincorporated communities in Holmes County, Mississippi
Unincorporated communities in Mississippi